Jarriett Buie (born September 7, 1984) is a former American football defensive end. He was also a member of the Florida Tuskers of the United Football League. He was signed by the Tampa Bay Buccaneers as an undrafted free agent in 2009. He played college football at South Florida.

Early years 
Attended Armwood High School in Seffner, Florida. Ranked 22nd-best defensive end by Rivals.com Ranked as 25th-best player in the state by Tampa Tribune and 39th by Orlando Sentinel Ranked No. 2 overall player in Tampa Bay area by St. Petersburg Times and also a member of that papers all-Suncoast team First-team Class 4A all-state for (15-0) state champion Armwood High Hilllsborough County Defensive Player of the Year by Tampa Tribune 44 tackles prior to state playoffs, including nine sacks and 14 tackles for loss Also had two caused fumbles.

College career 
In 2004, he sat out season while concentrating on his academics.

Buie missed the 2005 season with a broken foot in preseason camp ended his season. He did dress for the final few games, but did not see action.

In 2006, he started four games among his 12 appearances and had 17 tackles, with one sack.

In 2007, he was a starter at defensive end— he started nine games and made 26 tackles, including six tackles for loss, one sack, two fumble recoveries and 13 quarterback hurries.

In 2008, he started and played in all 13 games and finished year with five sacks, 31 tackles, three quarterback hurries and two pass breakups.

Professional career

Pre-draft

Tampa Bay Buccaneers
After going undrafted in the 2009 NFL Draft, Buie signed with the Tampa Bay Buccaneers as an undrafted free agent. He was waived on August 29, only to be re-signed on September 1.

References

External links
South Florida Bulls bio
Tampa Bay Buccaneers bio

1985 births
American football defensive ends
Florida Tuskers players
Living people
Players of American football from Tampa, Florida
South Florida Bulls football players
Tampa Bay Buccaneers players
Tampa Bay Storm players